is a Japanese mixed martial artist currently competing in Bellator MMA and Rizin FF in the Flyweight division. He is the former bantamweight champion in both organizations. As of December 13, 2022, he is #6 in the Bellator Bantamweight Rankings.

A professional competitor since 2010, Horiguchi formerly competed in the Ultimate Fighting Championship and is the former Shooto Bantamweight Champion. He graduated from Sakushin Gakuin High School in Utsunomiya, Tochigi, Japan.

Background
Horiguchi began training in karate at the age of five and was talented, as he soon began competing in full-contact competitions and went on to become a regional champion. At the age of 16, Horiguchi viewed a PRIDE Fighting Championships event and became drawn to mixed martial arts. Horiguchi began training in the sport at Norifumi Yamamoto's Krazy Bee Gym after graduating high school when he was 18 years old. Horiguchi said seeing Yamamoto knockout bigger men was what drew him to the fighter.

Mixed martial arts career

Shooto
Horiguchi made his professional MMA debut in Shooto in 2010, winning a decision over Ranki Kawana. Prior to this, Horiguchi was Bantamweight fighter, Norifumi Yamamoto's sparring partner. Just two fights later he would win the Shooto 2010 Rookie Tournament, finishing Seiji Akao by TKO early in the second round.

His biggest victory up to that time would come over the 2009 Rookie Tournament runner-up, Yuta Nezu. Horiguchi's knockout power was on display early, knocking out Nezu in the first round. His nickname is The Typhoon.

Horiguchi took on the former Shooto Bantamweight Champion, Masakatsu Ueda on January 8, 2012. Ueda controlled most of the bout with his superior grappling, nearly submitting Horiguchi numerous times. He lost by a majority decision.

Horiguchi captured the Shooto Bantamweight Championship on March 16, 2013 when he defeated Hiromasa Ougikubo submitting him in the second round by rear-naked choke.

On June 22, Horiguchi fought Pancrase Bantamweight Champion, Shintaro Ishiwatari, at VTJ 2nd, where Horiguchi acted as a Shooto representative. The two engaged in a competitive, back and forth fight. Many outlets had Ishiwatari leading on the scorecards heading into the final round. Horiguchi rallied early in the fifth round, landing a barrage of punches on Ishiwatari to force the stoppage and defend his title.

Ultimate Fighting Championship
Horiguchi made his promotional debut against Dustin Pague on October 19, 2013 at UFC 166. He was victorious in his debut, winning the fight via TKO in the second round.

Horiguchi was expected to face Chris Cariaso in a Flyweight bout on February 1, 2014 at UFC 169.  However, Horiguchi pulled out of the bout citing injury and was replaced by WEC veteran Danny Martinez.

Horiguchi faced Darrell Montague on May 10, 2014 at UFC Fight Night 40. He won the fight via unanimous decision.

A rescheduled bout with Chris Cariaso was expected to take place on September 20, 2014 at UFC Fight Night 52.  However, Cariaso was pulled from the bout with Horiguchi in favor of a matchup with current flyweight champion Demetrious Johnson at UFC 178. Horiguchi instead faced Jon Delos Reyes. He won the fight via TKO in the first round.

Horoguchi faced Louis Gaudinot on January 3, 2015 at UFC 182. He won the fight by unanimous decision.

Horiguchi faced Flyweight champion Demetrious Johnson on April 25, 2015 in the main event at UFC 186. Despite doing well during the first round, Horiguchi lost the otherwise one-sided fight via an armbar submission at 4:59 of the fifth round, resulting in the latest finish in UFC history.

Horiguchi faced Chico Camus at UFC Fight Night 75 on September 27, 2015. He won the fight by unanimous decision.

Horiguchi next faced Neil Seery on May 8, 2016 at UFC Fight Night 87. He won the fight via unanimous decision.

Horiguchi was expected to face Ali Bagautinov on October 15, 2016 at UFC Fight Night 97. However, the promotion announced on October 6 that they had cancelled the event entirely. In turn, the pairing was quickly rescheduled and took place on November 19, 2016 at UFC Fight Night 99. He won the fight via unanimous decision.

It was announced on February 17, 2017 that Horiguchi chose not to renew his contract with the UFC.

Rizin Fighting Federation

In joining RIZIN, Horiguchi says he felt more at home and enjoyed the shows RIZIN put on built around him.

On April 16, 2017 Horiguchi made his debut in Rizin Fighting Federation, where he defeated Yuki Motoya by unanimous decision.

Horiguichi next faced Hideo Tokoro in the first round of the Rizin Bantamweight Grand Prix on July 30, 2017 at Rizin 6. He won the fight via knockout in the first round.

Horiguchi competed in the rest of the Bantamweight Grand Prix in December 2017, fighting three times over two days. In the quarter-finals, he faced Gabriel Oliviera on December 29, 2017 at Rizin World Grand Prix 2017: 2nd Round. He won the fight via TKO in the first round. He advanced to the next round, which was held on December 31, 2017 at Rizin World Grand Prix 2017: Final Round. He faced Manel Kape in the semi-finals and won via arm-triangle choke submission in the third round. In the final, he faced Shintaro Ishiwatari and won via knockout early into the second round to become the inaugural RIZIN Bantamweight Champion.

Horiguchi faced fellow UFC veteran Ian McCall in the main event at Rizin 10 on May 6, 2018. He defeated McCall just 9 seconds into the first round via KO. This was the second fastest stoppage in Rizin history.

After a 9-second knockout victory, Horiguchi made a quick turnaround to face fellow Japanese champion Hiromasa Ougikubo in a long-awaited rematch. Ogikubo, the current Shooto bantamweight champion, had not lost since he last faced Horiguchi in 2013. Horiguchi won the bout via unanimous decision.

On September 30, 2018, Horiguchi fought Japanese Kickboxer Tenshin Nasukawa at Rizin 13 under Rizin Kickboxing rules, and lost by unanimous decision.

Horiguchi faced the reigning Bellator Bantamweight champion Darrion Caldwell for the vacant Rizin Bantamweight Championship at Rizin 14 on December 31, 2018. He won the fight by submission via a guillotine choke.

Horiguchi next faced Ben Nguyen in a 132 pound catchweight bout on April 21, 2019 at Rizin 15. He won the fight via TKO in the first round.

Horiguchi headlined Rizin 18 on August 18, 2019 against Kai Asakura in a non-title bout. He lost the fight via technical knockout in the first round.

Horiguchi was expected to defend his Rizin FF Bantamweight Championship title against Kai Asakura in a rematch at Rizin 20 on December 31, 2019. However, Horiguchi pulled out of the fight in mid-November citing a knee injury that is expected to keep him out of action for approximately 10 – 12 months. In turn, his bantamweight title has been vacated.

Bellator MMA / Rizin
In April 2019, it was announced that Horiguchi would face Darrion Caldwell for the Bellator Bantamweight title on June 14, 2019 at Bellator 222. The pair previously fought in December 2018 in the Rizin promotion with Horiguchi winning by submission. Scott Coker, president of Bellator MMA disclosed to the media that Horiguchi's contract features a rematch clause. Should Horiguchi win the rematch, he will be obligated to defend the Bellator belt once a year. Horiguchi won the bout and title by unanimous decision. However, due to the injury suffered in October 2019, Horiguchi vacated his Bellator Bantamweight championship in late November 2019.

After undergoing a successful knee surgery, Horiguchi is set to make his return to mixed martial arts, following a 15 month hiatus from the sport. He rematched Kai Asakura during Rizin 26 – Saitama. Going into the rematch with Asakura, Horiguchi said it was his goal to dispel any rumors about ACL injuries finishing an athlete's career. Horiguchi said he is also feeling almost completely healed leading into the fight. “I’m about 100% recovered. I had to start from zero after the surgery and built back the muscles that have gotten weak. But the hard work and long rehab has paid off and I am back.” Horiguchi won the fight by a first-round TKO.

In September 2021, Horiguchi was announced to be a Bellator contracted fighter, however due to longstanding relationship between Bellator and Rizin, Horiguchi will remain the Rizin Bantamweight Champion, and the plan, once COVID travel restrictions ease, is for him to still fight in Japan on occasion.

Horiguchi competed for the Bellator Bantamweight World Championship against champion Sergio Pettis on December 3, 2021 at Bellator 272. Despite having controlled most of the bout beforehand, Horiguchi lost the fight via knockout in round four.

In the first round bout of the $1 million Bellator Bantamweight World Grand Prix Tournament, Horiguchi faced Patchy Mix on April 23, 2022 at Bellator 279. He lost the bout via unanimous decision.

Horiguchi faced Yuto Hokamura at Rizin 38 on September 25, 2022. After surviving an early knockdown, Horiguchi won the bout via a technical submission in the second round.

Return to Flyweight 
Moving down to Flyweight, Horiguchi faced Hiromasa Ougikubo at Bellator MMA vs. Rizin on December 31, 2022. Vacating the RIZIN Bantamweight Championship before the bout as he intends to fight at flyweight going into the future, Horiguchi dominated Ougikubo in his return to flyweight after 5 years on the way to a unanimous decision victory.

Horiguchi is scheduled to face Ray Borg on April 22, 2023 at Bellator 295.

Championships and accomplishments

Mixed martial arts
Shooto 
Shooto Bantamweight Championship (One time; former)
One successful title defense
Shooto 2010 Rookie Tournament Winner
Rizin Fighting Federation
RIZIN Bantamweight Championship (Two times)
2017 RIZIN Bantamweight Grand Prix Championship
Bellator MMA
Bellator Bantamweight World Championship (One time)

Mixed martial arts record

|-
|Win
|align=center| 31–5
|Hiromasa Ougikubo
|Decision (unanimous)
|Bellator MMA vs. Rizin
|
|align=center| 3
|align=center| 5:00
|Saitama, Japan
|
|-
|Win
|align=center|30–5
|Yuto Hokamura
|Technical Submission (arm-triangle choke)
|Rizin 38
|
|align=center|2
|align=center|2:59
|Saitama, Japan
|
|-
|Loss
|align=center|29–5
|Patchy Mix
|Decision (unanimous)
|Bellator 279
|
|align=center|5
|align=center|5:00
|Honolulu, Hawaii, United States
|
|-
|Loss
|align=center|29–4
|Sergio Pettis
|KO (spinning backfist)
|Bellator 272
|
|align=center|4
|align=center|3:24
|Uncasville, Connecticut, United States
|
|-
|Win
|align=center|29–3
|Kai Asakura
|TKO (punches)
|Rizin 26
|
|align=center|1
|align=center|2:48
|Saitama, Japan
|
|-
|Loss
|align=center|28–3
|Kai Asakura
|KO (punches)
|Rizin 18
|
|align=center|1
|align=center|1:07
|Nagoya, Japan
|
|-
|Win
|align=center|28–2
|Darrion Caldwell 
|Decision (unanimous)
|Bellator 222
|
|align=center|5
|align=center|5:00
|New York City, New York, United States
|
|-
|Win
|align=center|27–2
|Ben Nguyen
|KO (punches)
|Rizin 15
|
|align=center|1
|align=center|2:53
|Yokohama, Japan
|
|-
|Win
|align=center|26–2
|Darrion Caldwell
|Submission (guillotine choke)
|Rizin 14
|
|align=center|3
|align=center|1:19
|Saitama, Japan
|
|-
|Win
|align=center|25–2
|Hiromasa Ougikubo
|Decision (unanimous)
|Rizin 11
|
|align=center|2
|align=center|5:00
|Saitama, Japan
|
|-
|Win
|align=center|24–2
|Ian McCall
|KO (punch)
|Rizin 10
|
|align=center|1
|align=center|0:09
|Fukuoka, Japan  
|
|-
|Win
|align=center|23–2
|Shintaro Ishiwatari
|KO (punches)
| rowspan=2|Rizin World Grand Prix 2017: Final Round
| rowspan=2|
|align=center|2
|align=center|0:14
| rowspan=2|Saitama, Japan
|
|-
|Win
|align=center|22–2
|Manel Kape
|Submission (arm-triangle choke)
|align=center|3
|align=center|4:27
|
|-
|Win
|align=center|21–2
|Gabriel Oliveira
|TKO (punches)
|Rizin World Grand Prix 2017: 2nd Round
|
|align=center|1
|align=center|4:30
|Saitama, Japan
|
|-
|Win
|align=center|20–2
|Hideo Tokoro
|KO (punches)
|Rizin World Grand Prix 2017: Opening Round - Part 1
|
|align=center|1
|align=center|1:49
|Saitama, Japan
|
|-
|Win
|align=center|19–2
|Yuki Motoya
|Decision (unanimous)
|Rizin FF 5: Sakura
|
|align=center|2
|align=center|5:00
|Yokohama, Japan
|
|-
|Win
|align=center|18–2
|Ali Bagautinov
|Decision (unanimous)
|UFC Fight Night: Mousasi vs. Hall 2
|
|align=center|3
|align=center|5:00
|Belfast, Northern Ireland
| 
|-
|Win
|align=center|17–2
|Neil Seery
|Decision (unanimous)
|UFC Fight Night: Overeem vs. Arlovski
|
|align=center|3
|align=center|5:00
|Rotterdam, Netherlands
|
|-
|Win
| align=center| 16–2
| Chico Camus
| Decision (unanimous)
| UFC Fight Night: Barnett vs. Nelson
| 
| align=center|3
| align=center|5:00
| Saitama, Japan
|
|-
| Loss
| align=center| 15–2
| Demetrious Johnson
| Submission (armbar)
| UFC 186
| 
| align=center| 5
| align=center| 4:59
| Montreal, Quebec, Canada
| 
|-
| Win
| align=center| 15–1
| Louis Gaudinot
| Decision (unanimous)
| UFC 182
| 
| align=center| 3
| align=center| 5:00
| Las Vegas, Nevada, United States
| 
|-
| Win
| align=center| 14–1
| Jon delos Reyes
| TKO (punches)
| UFC Fight Night: Hunt vs. Nelson
| 
| align=center| 1
| align=center| 3:48
| Saitama, Japan
| 
|-
| Win
| align=center| 13–1
| Darrell Montague
| Decision (unanimous)
| UFC Fight Night: Brown vs. Silva
| 
| align=center| 3
| align=center| 5:00
| Cincinnati, Ohio, United States
| 
|-
| Win
| align=center| 12–1
| Dustin Pague
| TKO (punches)
| UFC 166
| 
| align=center| 2
| align=center| 3:51
| Houston, Texas, United States
| 
|-
| Win
| align=center| 11–1
| Shintaro Ishiwatari
| TKO (punches)
| Vale Tudo Japan 2nd
| 
| align=center| 5
| align=center| 0:41
| Tokyo, Japan
| 
|-
| Win
| align=center| 10–1
| Hiromasa Ougikubo
| Submission (rear-naked choke)
| Shooto: 2nd Round 2013
| 
| align=center| 2
| align=center| 1:35
| Tokyo, Japan
| 
|-
| Win
| align=center| 9–1
| Ian Loveland
| Decision (unanimous)
| Vale Tudo Japan 1st
| 
| align=center| 3
| align=center| 5:00
| Tokyo, Japan
| 
|-
| Win
| align=center| 8–1
| Manabu Inoue
| Decision (unanimous)
| Shooto: 8th Round
| 
| align=center| 3
| align=center| 5:00
| Tokyo, Japan
| 
|-
| Win
| align=center| 7–1
| Tetsu Suzuki
| TKO (punches)
| Shooto: 3rd Round
| 
| align=center| 1
| align=center| 2:06
| Tokyo, Japan
| 
|-
| Loss
| align=center| 6–1
| Masakatsu Ueda
| Decision (majority)
| Shooto: Survivor Tournament Final
| 
| align=center| 3
| align=center| 5:00
| Tokyo, Japan
| 
|-
| Win
| align=center| 6–0
| Naohiro Mizuno
| KO (punches)
| Shooto: Shootor's Legacy 4
| 
| align=center| 2
| align=center| 3:26
| Tokyo, Japan
| 
|-
| Win
| align=center| 5–0
| Yuta Nezu
| KO (punch)
| Shooto: Shootor's Legacy 3
| 
| align=center| 1
| align=center| 3:17
| Tokyo, Japan
| 
|-
| Win
| align=center| 4–0
| Takahiro Hosoi
| TKO (punches)
| Shooto: Shooto Tradition 2011
| 
| align=center| 1
| align=center| 1:06
| Tokyo, Japan
| 
|-
| Win
| align=center| 3–0
| Seiji Akao
| TKO (punches)
| Shooto: The Rookie Tournament 2010 Final
| 
| align=center| 2
| align=center| 0:43
| Tokyo, Japan
| 
|-
| Win
| align=center| 2–0
| Keita Ishibashi
| TKO (doctor stoppage)
| Shooto: Gig Tokyo 5
| 
| align=center| 1
| align=center| 2:23
| Tokyo, Japan
| 
|-
| Win
| align=center| 1–0
| Ranki Kawana
| Decision (unanimous)
| Shooto: Kitazawa Shooto Vol. 3
| 
| align=center| 2
| align=center| 5:00
| Tokyo, Japan
|

Amateur mixed martial arts record

|-
|Win
|align=center| 4-0
|Sakuma Kenta
|Decision (Unanimous)
|6th East Japan Amateur Shooto Open Tournament
|December 20, 2009
|align=center|2
|align=center|3:00
|Sagamihara, Japan
|Won the East Japan Amateur Shooto Tournament.
|-
|Win
|align=center| 3-0
|Kawahara Yu
|Decision (Unanimous)
|6th East Japan Amateur Shooto Open Tournament
|December 20, 2009
|align=center|1
|align=center|4:00
|Sagamihara, Japan
|East Japan Amateur Shooto Tournament Semi-finals.
|-
|Win
|align=center| 2-0
|Uoi Mamoru
|TKO (Injury)
|6th East Japan Amateur Shooto Open Tournament
|December 20, 2009
|align=center|1
|align=center|0:25
|Sagamihara, Japan
|East Japan Amateur Shooto Tournament Quarter-finals.
|-
|Win
|align=center| 1-0
|Naito Naiki
|Decision (Unanimous)
|6th East Japan Amateur Shooto Open Tournament
|December 20, 2009
|align=center|1
|align=center|4:00
|Sagamihara, Japan
|East Japan Amateur Shooto Tournament First Round.
|-
|}

Kickboxing record

See also
List of current Bellator MMA fighters
List of current Rizin FF fighters
 List of male mixed martial artists

References

External links
 
 
 
 
 Official Shooto profile

1990 births
Living people
Japanese male mixed martial artists
Japanese male karateka
Bantamweight mixed martial artists
Mixed martial artists utilizing shootfighting
Mixed martial artists utilizing Shotokan
Flyweight mixed martial artists
Bellator MMA champions
Bellator male fighters
Ultimate Fighting Championship male fighters
People from Takasaki, Gunma
People from Coconut Creek, Florida